Kalmashbashevo (Qalmaşbaş) is a rural locality (a selo) and the administrative centre of Kalmashbashevsky Selsoviet, Chekmagushevsky District, Bashkortostan, Russia. The population was 774 as of 2010. There are 4 streets.

Geography 
Kalmashbashevo is located 18 km south of Chekmagush (the district's administrative centre) by road. Starobikkino is the nearest rural locality.

References 

Rural localities in Chekmagushevsky District